Rampage World Tour is a video game released in 1997 and is the second game in the Rampage series. The game was developed as an arcade game for Midway Games by Game Refuge Inc. designers Brian Colin and Jeff Nauman, who conceived and designed the original in 1986. It was ported to the Sega Saturn, Nintendo 64, Game Boy Color, PlayStation, Microsoft Windows and has been re-released on Midway Arcade Treasures 2 as well as being included in Rampage: Total Destruction.

Plot
George, Lizzie, and Ralph have been released due to an explosion at a Scumlabs facility. The trio begin to destroy all of Scumlabs' bases scattered throughout the world and kill its employees. In the last levels, Scumlabs CEO Eustace DeMonic turns himself into a monster in an attempt to combat George, Lizzie, and Ralph, but is defeated during a battle on a lunar base. After this, the only surviving Scumlabs employee Dr. Elizabeth Veronica tries to disintegrate the monsters with a ray gun on her spaceship, but it only shrinks them to a miniature size, and they wind up inside her ship. George and Ralph pose on the shelves, while Lizzie bounces atop of Veronica's breasts (though the latter portion is censored on home ports).

Gameplay

Like in the first Rampage game, the goal of every stage is to destroy all the buildings in each city while avoiding or destroying the military forces. If the player takes too long in destroying the city, jets will fly in and bomb the remaining buildings, ending the stage with a lower score.

In the first level, Peoria, a tourism billboard cycles through different regions in the country (Northeast, Southwest, etc.). Destroying the billboard when it is showing one of these regions will send the player in that direction. Players may also choose to eat or ignore the "World Tour" power-ups and control which country they can visit. After getting a World Tour power-up, the next few levels take place in a foreign location until a Scumlabs plant is destroyed. Purple radioactive waste temporarily transforms the player into a super monster known as V.E.R.N. The game will not end until every Scumlabs city has been destroyed, which may cause some erratic traveling around towards the end of the game (including multiple world tour trips if the players have missed or purposely kept from getting world tour flags).

The arcade version supports up to three players simultaneously. Though it was announced that the PlayStation version would also support three players, both the PlayStation and Saturn versions allow only two players. Three player support apparently was programmed into the port at one point and pulled at the last minute, since a review of the PlayStation version in Electronic Gaming Monthly describes three player gameplay. The Nintendo 64 conversion includes full three-player functionality.

Release
Shortly after the home ports were released, Rampage World Tour was exhibited at the JAMMA arcade show in Japan, but garnered little interest. The game would never be released in Japan.

Reception

Next Generation reviewed the arcade version of the game. They derided the decision to continue using sprites for the graphics instead of polygons, concluding that "Rampage World Tour seems aimed at satisfying gamers' yearning for past titles like Space Invaders or Pac-Man. Fair enough, but all this remake will accomplish is to make gamers yearn for the original more than ever."

Critics agreed that the console ports are nearly arcade-perfect, though some criticized the PlayStation and Saturn versions for supporting only two players instead of the three supported in the arcade version. However, they were divided about the game itself. Many hailed it as a fun revival of an arcade classic. For example, Shawn Smith wrote in Electronic Gaming Monthly that "There's nothing like sitting down and playing a good old-time game. It's even better to do it when it has been enhanced, but still has the same feel as the original." Despite giving the PlayStation version a score of only 5.7 out of 10, Jeff Gerstmann highly recommended the game due to its new gameplay tricks and larger levels, and said the only possible way to improve on it would be with three-player support. However, the majority criticized the game's 2D sidescrolling format as antiquated, and some further remarked that the simplicity and repetitiveness of the Rampage gameplay, while highly enjoyable in arcades, was not suited to the home console format. Adam Douglas explained in IGN that the Rampage series "was great for getting your aggressions out and then moving on. Why would you want to play this game for hours at a time?" Sega Saturn Magazine similarly held that "The coin-op was a great laugh for about ten minutes or so, but the lack of variety in the level design and the shallow nature of the gameplay meant that it soon grew quite tiresome. Despite the meagre improvements to the update, the very same criticisms can be levelled at Rampage World Tour."

In a review of the PlayStation version, GamePro was more undecided: "With plenty of special moves and power-ups to discover as you lay waste to more than 100 cities, the gameplay certainly lasts - just don't expect it to change much. Then again, sometimes it's good to turn off your brain and turn up the cosmic carnage." However, a different GamePro critic reviewed the Saturn version, and opined that the game's "utter failure to take advantage of new technology and add new elements to the original Rampage is inexcusable." Next Generation reviewed the Nintendo 64 version of the game, and stated that "Despite the three-player mode, no amount of graphic flash or nostalgia can improve a style of gameplay whose day has passed."

Charles Ardai of Computer Gaming World noted that the PC port of the game had performance and graphics issues when played in full-screen mode. The best performance was achieved when the screen was set to a postcard-sized frame. He found the action to be basic, although there is a variety of animation. He added that it is "suffused with all the monster movie fun that was conspicuously lacking in the recent Godzilla film".

References

External links

W
1997 video games
Arcade video games
Sega Saturn games
Midway video games
Nintendo 64 games
PlayStation (console) games
PlayStation Network games
Video game sequels
Windows games
Game Boy Color games
Saffire games
GT Interactive games
Video games developed in the United States
Video games with pre-rendered 3D graphics
Video games set in the United States
Video games set in Canada
Video games set in England
Video games set in Ireland
Video games set in France
Video games set in Monaco
Video games set in Spain
Video games set in Italy
Video games set in Greece
Video games set in Turkey
Video games set in Germany
Video games set in the Netherlands
Video games set in Denmark
Video games set in Romania
Video games set in Hungary
Video games set in Poland
Video games set in Ukraine
Video games set in Russia
Video games set in Japan
Video games set in Australia
Video games set in French Polynesia
Video games set in South Africa
Video games set in Kenya
Video games set in Morocco
Video games set in Egypt
Video games set in Nepal
Video games set in India
Video games set in Mexico
Video games set in Belize
Video games set in Brazil
Video games set on the Moon
Digital Eclipse games
Multiplayer and single-player video games
Game Refuge Inc. games